The Pitten is a river in Lower Austria.

The source of the Pitten is the confluence of its two headstreams  and Großer Pestingbach, near Hinterleiten, Feistritz am Wechsel. At Haderswörth in the parish of Lanzenkirchen, the Pitten and the Schwarza unite to form the Leitha, a  tributary of the Danube.

References

Rivers of Lower Austria
Rivers of Austria